Zico Waeytens (born 29 September 1991 in Ledegem) is a Belgian former professional cyclist, who rode professionally between 2012 and 2019 for the , ,  and  teams. He was named in the start list for the 2015 Vuelta a España.

Waeytens retired from cycling at the end of the 2019 season to pursue a career in boxing.

Major results

2008
 3rd Road race, National Junior Road Championships
2009
 1st  Overall Tour d'Istria
1st Stage 2
 1st  Overall Liège–La Gleize
 4th Remouchamps–Ferrières–Remouchamps
 10th Road race, UEC European Junior Road Championships
2010
 3rd Grand Prix de Waregem
 10th Overall Oberösterreich Rundfahrt
2011
 1st Flèche Ardennaise
 5th De Vlaamse Pijl
 9th Overall Danmark Rundt
2012
 6th Omloop van het Waasland
 7th Schaal Sels
2013
 3rd Overall Tour des Fjords
 7th Grand Prix de Wallonie
2014
 3rd Grote Prijs Stad Zottegem
 5th Overall Tour de Wallonie
1st  Sprints classification
 9th Le Samyn
 9th Kattekoers
 9th Internationale Wielertrofee Jong Maar Moedig
2015
 3rd Velothon Berlin
 6th Overall Ster ZLM Toer
2016
 1st Stage 4 Tour of Belgium
2018
 10th Great War Remembrance Race
2019
 5th Grand Prix La Marseillaise
 10th Tacx Pro Classic

Grand Tour general classification results timeline

References

External links

1991 births
Living people
Belgian male cyclists
People from Ledegem
Cyclists from West Flanders
21st-century Belgian people